Unstoppable Marriage is a South Korean sitcom that aired on KBS2 from November 5, 2007, to May 30, 2008, on Mondays to Fridays at 18:50 for 140 episodes. It was adapted from the 2007 South Korean film of the same name.

Plot
Madam Shim has four sons: Ki-baek, Yi-baek, Sam-baek, and Sa-baek. The eldest son, Ki-baek falls in love with Goo Mi-ho, the daughter of Madam Shim's enemy, Goo Gook. Third son Sam-beak becomes friends with Chae Soo-jung, a hotel management student at his mother's hotel, but things become complicated when he and older brother Yi-baek both fall for her. Soo-young and Yu-ri both have a crush on fourth son Sa-baek, but he doesn't return their feelings and constantly ignores them.

Cast

Main characters
Kim Soo-mi as Shim Mal-nyeon (Madam Shim)
Im Chae-moo as Goo Gook 
Seo Do-young as Wang Ki-baek (1st son)
Park Chae-kyung as Goo Mi-ho
Lee Jung as Wang Yi-baek (2nd son)
Kim Dong-wook as Wang Sam-baek (3rd son)
Jung Da-young as Chae Soo-jung
Lee Jae-jin as Wang Sa-baek (4th son)

Supporting characters
Choi Sooyoung as Soo-young
Kwon Yuri as Yu-ri
Kim Hye-na as Goo Hye-joo
Yoo Yeon-mi as Kim Ok-hee
Kim Jung-wook as Cha Joon-ho
Han Tae-yoon as Park Sang-mi
Park Jin-woo as Goo Jong-jae
Lee Ji-sook as Lee Han-nyeo
Hwang Hye-young as Nurse Jung
Mika as Nurse Oh
Kim Byung-choon as Lee Young-chul
Lee In-chul as Manager Jong
Lee In-hye as Park Eun-young
Lee Yong-joo as Jo Chan-joo
Kim Isak as Aida
F.T. Island (Lee Hong-gi, Choi Min-hwan, Choi Jong-hoon, Oh Won-bin) as Sa-baek's friends (cameo, episode 62)
Girls' Generation (Kim Tae-yeon, Jessica Jung, Sunny, Tiffany Young, Kim Hyo-yeon, Im Yoona, Seohyun) as Bulgwang-dong's Seven Princesses Gang (cameo, episode 64)

International broadcast
It aired on Japanese cable channel KBS Japan in June 2008.

References

External links 
Unstoppable Marriage official KBS website 

2007 South Korean television series debuts
2008 South Korean television series endings
Korean-language television shows
South Korean romantic comedy television series
Korean Broadcasting System television dramas
Television series by Pan Entertainment